Rajeev Shukla (born 13 September 1959) is an Indian politician, former journalist, political commentator and the former chairman of Indian Premier League.  In 2015, he was re-appointed unanimously as the Chairman of IPL by the BCCI. On 18 Dec 2020, he was elected unopposed Vice President of the BCCI.

Early life
Rajeev Shukla was born on 13 September 1959 in Kanpur, Uttar Pradesh. He was educated at Pandit Prithi Nath College, Kanpur and at Christ Church College, Kanpur. He then studied law at Vikramajit Singh Sanatan Dharma College, Kanpur. Before entering politics, he was a reporter for Hindi daily Jansatta. Shukla held this job until 1985, when he became a special correspondent for Ravivar Magazine. He was hired as a senior editor and he continued in that job until being elected to the Rajya Sabha in 2000. He has now joined the Indian National Congress

Political activities
Running as a member of the Akhil Bhartiya Loktantrik Congress Party, Shukla won by a large margin. In 2003, his party merged with the Indian National Congress, and Shukla was appointed as a spokesperson. He was nominated as a secretary to the All India Congress Committee in January 2006. In March 2006, Shukla was elected for a second term.

Shukla and Ranjeet Ranjan were elected unopposed to the Rajya Sabha from Chhattisgarh in June 2022.

References

External links 
 The Indian Express: Columnists > Rajeev Shukla
 http://www.dnaindia.com/india/report_now-congress-slips-on-ipl-muck-srk-link-with-rajiv-shukla-emerges_1374686

Indian male journalists
Indian National Congress politicians from Maharashtra
1959 births
Living people
People from Kanpur
Indian cricket administrators
Rajya Sabha members from Uttar Pradesh
Rajya Sabha members from Maharashtra
Members of the Board of Control for Cricket in India
Akhil Bharatiya Loktantrik Congress politicians